City of Ghosts may refer to:
 City of Ghosts (2002 film), an American crime thriller film
 City of Ghosts (2017 film), an Arabic-language American documentary film
 City of Ghosts (TV series), a 2021 French-American television series